Simon P. Brown (born 12 April 1963) is an English professional golfer who has won three times on the European Senior Tour since turning 50 in 2013. Two of his wins have been in tournaments reduced to 36 holes by bad weather.

Brown grew up in Sussex but moved to Austria in 1984 and then to Germany to become the professional at Golf Club Rhein-Sieg, in Bonn.

Professional wins (3)

European Senior Tour wins (3)

*Note: Tournament shortened to 36 holes due to weather.

External links

English male golfers
European Senior Tour golfers
Sportspeople from Worthing
1963 births
Living people